Hidetsugu (written: 秀次 or 英嗣) is a masculine Japanese given name. Notable people with the name include:

, Japanese architect
, Japanese daimyō
Hidetsugu Ikegami, Japanese physicist
, Japanese comedian
, Japanese electrical engineer

Japanese masculine given names